NIILM University is a private university in Kaithal in the state of Haryana, India.

History
The NIILM University was initially proposed to be established by the NIILM Education Trust in Palwal in June 2009 but on 4 January 2010 the location was changed to Kaithal in the presentation to the government. The university was established in 2011 through The Haryana Private Universities (Amendment) Act, 2011.

Schools
NIILM University has the following schools:
 School of Law
 School of Hotel Management
 School of Arts and Science
 School Of Agricultural Sciences And Forestry

References

External links
 

Private universities in India
Universities in Haryana
Kaithal
Educational institutions established in 2011
2011 establishments in Haryana